The Zakspeed 891 was a Formula One car for the  season run by the German Zakspeed team. Its drivers were German Bernd Schneider in his second year with the team and F1 rookie Aguri Suzuki from Japan. The car was powered by F1 newcomer Yamaha who had produced the OX88 V8 engine for exclusive use by Zakspeed in Formula One.

Due to neither Schneider nor his  team mate Piercarlo Ghinzani scoring any points in the 881, the team was forced into pre-qualifying in order to be able to try to qualify for a race. While Schneider was able to qualify his car 25th for the 1989 Brazilian Grand Prix, it would prove to be a false hope with the German only able to pre-qualify and qualify once more, at the 1989 Japanese Grand Prix. Suzuki never made it past pre-qualifying at any of the 16 rounds during the season.

Most of this was attributed to what was found to be a very underpowered Yamaha engine. Late in the season following another double failure to pre-qualify at the Spanish Grand Prix, the Yamaha OX88 V8 was reported to be producing only . This compared badly to the base  of the customer Ford Cosworth and Judd V8s and the Lamborghini V12 being used by most of the other teams. It was also unfavorable in comparison to the  -  bhp of the top four engines, the V10's of Honda (McLaren) and Renault (Williams), the Ferrari V12, and the Ford V8 (Benetton). This made Schneider qualifying 21st for the following race in Japan all the more impressive.

The 891 was the last Formula One car to be produced by Zakspeed as the team pulled out of Grand Prix racing following the 1989 season.

Complete Formula One results
(key)

References

Books
 

1989 Formula One season cars
Zakspeed Formula One cars